Western Krahn is the principal language spoken by the Krahn people of Liberia and Ivory Coast.  It is part of a series a dialects of the Wee (Guere) dialect continuum spoken by the Krahn and Guere peoples.

See also 
 Konobo language (Eastern Krahn)
 Sapo language (Southern Krahn)

References

 
Languages of Liberia
Wee languages

pms:Lenga Krahn oriental